Ladley is a surname. Notable people with the surname include:

Dave Ladley (born 1975), English darts player
Matt Ladley (born 1991), American snowboarder

See also
Adley
Hadley (name)